The Oldtimer Grand Prix on the Salzburgring near Salzburg, Austria, had been brought into being by Prof. Dr. Helmut Krackowizer, the famous Austrian journalist and ex-motorcycle racer.

After his retreat in 1955 from active motorcycle racing he started to search for historical motorcycles throughout Europe.  Some of these discoveries he kept to himself; having let them be restored, he exchanged and sold them. In 1967 he founded one of the first vintage motor clubs in Austria and for a short period he was president of the Austrian Vintage Club Association in 1976.

Krackowizer knew nearly all vintage motorcycles in detail, kept the legends of rare motorcycles in mind and told the biographies of motorcycle racers. He counted as friends Sammy Miller, John Surtees, Walter Zeller, Luigi Taveri, Hans Haldemann, Georg Schorsch Meier and many other persons of the motor racing scene.  He was a member of the Rudge Club in England.

One of his great dreams became reality with the legendary "Oldtimer Grand Prix" on the Salzburgring in the years between 1974 and 1994, which took place nine times: 1974, 1975, 1976, 1978, 1979, 1981, 1983, 1985 and 1987. Stars like Niki Lauda, Juan Manuel Fangio and the above-mentioned motorcycle racers came to this event for vintage cars and motorcycles. Mercedes Benz sent the famous "Silver Arrows", and more than 100 cars and up to 250 motorcycles joined this event each year.

The participants

About 70 to 100 automobiles and around 200 vintage motorcycles appeared from throughout Europe. Among the most prominent participants were:

Among the automobiles

 Juan Manuel Fangio, five times world champion from Argentina, came in 1979 with a Mercedes Benz Grand Prix racing car W 196 from 1955 and had been the star of the event
 Niki Lauda, the Austrian world champion in formula 1 drove a legendary Mercedes Benz "Silver Arrow"
 Prof. Dr. Max Reisch with his Steyr Typ 100 6/32 HP, 1400 cm³, in which he drove around the world in the 1930s
 Bill Lomas, Great Britain, 1955 and 1956 world champion on Moto Guzzi
 Luigi Taveri, three times world champion from Switzerland on Honda
 John Surtees, Great Britain, the only world champion on both two and four wheels
 1977: the Austrian Otto Mathé, Innsbruck, with his Porsche "Urahn", the Berlin-Rom-car 1940, based on VW, but never produced for the public
 1977: Hans Herrmann, Germany, with a Mercedes-Benz-300 SLR
 1981: the Porsche work racer Jürgen Barth
 1981: Bosch-racing manager Jüttner

Among the motorcyclists

 "Wiggerl" Kraus and his "Schmiermaxe" Bernhard Huser—BMW—sidecar racer. Kraus had been German Champion five times
 Jock West, Great Britain—BMW—work racer 1937–1939
 Reinhard Hollaus, the brother of the only Austrian motorcycle world champion Rupert Hollaus, who died 1954 in training at Monza, rode the Hollaus original winning NSU Rennfox 125 cm³ from 1954
 Franz Falk from Graz, Austria
 Georg "Schorsch" Meier, from Bavaria; he rode BMW
 Fritz Walcher, winner of the first race after the Second World War in October 1946 in Salzburg-Nonntal
 the brothers Ferdinand and Edi Kranavetvogl, both motorcycle racers from Salzburg
 Siegfried Cmyral, who rode from 1929 until 1932 in the legendary supercharged Puch
 August "Gustl" Hobl—DKW—work racer in the 1950s, multiple German champion
 Franta Stastny vice world champion from Czechoslovakia
 Hans Haldemann from Switzerland, had been among the world's best racers several times with his fast Norton sidecar
 Walter Zeller, Germany—BMW—work racer, multiple German champion and one time vice world champion
 Erwin Lechner, Austria, seven times Austrian motorcycle champion
 Nello Paganini, Italy
 Fritz Walcher from Salzburg, Austria

Among the vehicles

To mention a few: 
 1981 a legendary "Silver Arrow" from Mercedes Benz in which Hermann Lang became European Champion in 1939; this 3-liter supercharged racing car with around 500 HP was driven by Niki Lauda
 1981 a 1.5-liter-four-cylinder-supercharged Mercedes Benz 1924, the oldest car, which came from the "Deutschen Museum" in Munich and had won the Targa Florio in 1924
 1981 a Talbot-Largo-Grand-Prix-car from 1949, the "Delahaye-Sport", driven by Prince Hohenlohe-Langenburg
 1981 Helmut Schellenberg with his Bugatti 35 C, the winning car of Prince Lobkowitz at the Gaisbergrennen, Salzburg, in 1930 and had a spectacular crash with it
...as well as an Austro Daimler ADM 1924, DKW F1 racing car 1930, Rolls-Royce 20/25 from 1934, Mercedes Benz 300 SL from 1952, a Staguellini Formel Junior 1959 (the Stanguellini company is based in Modena, Italy. Niki Lauda was driving such a car in his early career);

Among the motorcycles

 in 1981 one saw for the first time a working NSU-350-cm³ from 1937 with the latest double cam shaft motor from the English engineer Walter Moore, manufacturer of the NSU-Königswellen-motorcycle until 1938—this motorcycle was restored and ridden by Heinz Metzmeier from Baden, Germany
 1981 the German Günther Warnecke from Bremen came with a rare 500er Rudge TT Replica 350 cm³, which was restored by him and ridden by his son
 Reinhard Hollaus rode the NSU Rennfox 125 cm³, the winning motorcycle of his brother Rupert
 1974 Ivan Rhodes (GB) the only 500-cm³-works-Velocette still running, which was the motorcycle of Stanley Woods (GB) before 1939, 10 times winner of the TT
 1974 Hans Wilhelm Busch (Germany) brought a 1925 eight valve V-2-Cylinder Wanderer to Salzburg
 1987 Michael Krauser Jr. came with the ex-world champion-BMW-sidecar of Deubel/Hörner of 1961
 1987 the fast German Erwin Bongards rode the entirely covered double cam shaft one cylinder Guzzi of 1955
Also, a Scott TT 500 of 1926, Puch 250 Sport of 1928, Megola 640 5-cylinder of 1923, DKW 350 SS of 1939 and  many Rudge-bikes.  The range of motorcycles started with Ariel and AJS and continued through Brough-Superior, BSA, Calthorpe, DKW, D-Rad, Douglas, Gillet Herstal, Humber, Harley-Davidson, Moto Guzzi, Megola, Norton, New Imperial, NSU, Puch, Raleigh, Rudge, Schütthoff, Standard, Velocette and Wimmer to Zenith

References
 The Motorcycle Literature and Picture Archives Prof. Dr. Helmut Krackowizer
 Salzburgwiki
 Motorradkultur 1900 - 1970, Salzburger Museum Carolino Augusteum, 2001, Seite 23, 
 Salzburger Automobil- und Motorradgeschichte, Verlag Anton Pustet, 1997, Helmut Krackowizer, Erich Marx, Guido Müller, Knut Rakus, Volker Rothschädl and Harald Waitzbauer
 Motorveteranen Club Salzburg
 www.motorraeder.us and 

Auto races in Austria
Historic motorsport events